The 1992 CONCACAF Champions' Cup, also known as the American Airlines Cup for sponsorship reasons, was the 28th edition of the annual international club football competition held in the CONCACAF region (North America, Central America and the Caribbean), the CONCACAF Champions' Cup.  It determined that year's club champion of football in the CONCACAF region and was played from 1 February 1992 until 5 January 1993.

The teams were split in 2 zones (North/Central and Caribbean), each one qualifying two teams to the final tournament.  All qualifying matches were played under the home/away match system, while the final was played in California.  Both zones were also split into 2 groups, so one team of each qualified to the finals.

Unlike previous editions, the final was a single match played in Los Angeles (neutral venue), where Mexican Club América beat Costa Rican Liga Deportiva Alajuelense 1–0, therefore winning their four CONCACAF trophy. The Vancouver 86ers became the first Canadian team to qualify for the tournament, but ultimately withdrew before the first round.

North/Central America Zone

Group 1

First round 

 Motagua, Luis Ángel Firpo and Alajuelense advanced to Second Round.

Second round

 Alajuelense advanced to Third Round.  Luis Ángel Firpo on a bye.

Third round

|}

Group 2

First round

|}
Vancouver 86ers withdrew before 1st leg

Second round

|}
S.F. Bay Blackhawks and Dallas Rockets advance to the Third Round.

Third round

|}
Dallas Rockets and S.F. Bay Blackhawks advance to the Fourth Round.

Fourth round

|}
Club América advance to the Fifth Round.

Fifth round

|}
Club América advance to the CONCACAF Final Series.

Caribbean Zone

Group 1
Preliminary Round

|}
San Cristobal Bancredicard advance to the first round.

First Round

|}
RKVFC Sithoc, Aiglon du Lamentin, SV Transvaal and Solidarité Scolaire advance to the second round.

Second Round

|}
RKVFC Sithoc and Aiglon du Lamentin  advance to the third round.

Third Round

|}
Aiglon du Lamentin advance to the CONCACAF Final Series.

Group 2
Preliminary Round

|}
Guayama F.C. withdrew.*
Rockmaster F.C. advance to the first round.

First Round

|}
Scholars FC withdrew before 1st leg*
SV Robinhood, Mayaro United, US Robert and L'Etoile de Morne-à-l'Eau advance to the second round.

Second Round

|}
L'Etoile de Morne-à-l'Eau and SV Robinhood advance to the third round.

Third Round

|}
SV Robinhood advance to the CONCACAF Final Series.

Semi-finals 
October 7, 1992

Played in Santiago de Querétaro, Querétaro - (MEX)

|}

Played in San José, Costa Rica

|}

Final

Champion

References

CONCACAF Champions' Cup
1
c
c